Lawrence Edwin Craig (born July 20, 1945) is an American retired politician from the state of Idaho. A Republican, he served 18 years in the United States Senate (1991–2009), preceded by 10 years in the U.S. House of Representatives, representing Idaho's 1st District (1981–91). His 28 years in Congress rank as the second-longest in Idaho history, trailing only William Borah, who served over 32 years in the Senate. In addition to serving in Congress, Craig has been a member of the board of directors of the National Rifle Association since 1983. Craig was selected for induction into the Idaho Hall of Fame in 2007, but was not inducted.

Born in Council, Idaho, Craig was raised on a ranch in Washington County. He attended the University of Idaho, receiving a Bachelor of Arts degree in political science from the university in 1969, and later briefly attended George Washington University before returning to Washington County in 1971 to work in his family's ranching business. Following a brief stint in the Idaho Army National Guard, Craig ran for and won a seat in the Idaho Senate in 1974, and was re-elected in 1976 and 1978, before his successful first run for Congress to represent Idaho's 1st congressional district in the House of Representatives in 1980. He won reelection four times before running for the U.S. Senate in 1990, defeating Ron J. Twilegar in the general election and winning reelection in 1996 and 2002.

On June 11, 2007, Craig was arrested for indecent behavior in a men's restroom at Minneapolis–St. Paul International Airport; he pleaded guilty to a charge of disorderly conduct in August 2007 and paid less than $600 in court fines. The arrest remained unknown to the public until the Washington, D.C.-based newspaper Roll Call disclosed it in an article, drawing widespread public attention as well as charges of hypocrisy against Craig, as he had been an opponent of LGBT rights in the United States but was accused of homosexual activity. Despite stating that he was not and never had been homosexual, Craig announced, on September 1, 2007, that he would resign from the Senate, effective September 30, 2007, but later reversed this decision and decided to finish the remainder of his term, although he chose not to run for re-election in 2008.

He was succeeded by Lieutenant Governor and former Governor Jim Risch, who won the seat in the 2008 election. Craig subsequently co-founded the consulting firm New West Strategies and became a lobbyist.

Early life and family
Craig was born in Council, Idaho, the son of Dorothy Lenore (née McCord) and Elvin Oren Craig. He grew up on a ranch outside Midvale in Washington County. In 1969 he received his Bachelor of Arts degree in political science from the University of Idaho. At the University of Idaho, he was student body president and a member of the Delta Chi fraternity. He pursued graduate studies at George Washington University before returning to his family's Midvale ranching business in 1971. Craig was a member of the Idaho Army National Guard from 1970 to 1972, attaining the rank of Private First Class (E3), after which he received an honorable discharge.

Craig married Suzanne Scott in July 1983 and adopted the three children she had from a previous marriage. Through his adopted children, Craig has nine grandchildren.

Political career
Craig was elected to the Idaho Senate in 1974 and reelected in 1976 and 1978.

In 1980, Craig was elected to an open seat in the U.S. House of Representatives, representing Idaho's 1st Congressional District. He succeeded Republican Steve Symms, who was leaving the House to run for election to the Senate against incumbent Democrat Frank Church. Craig was re-elected four times, serving until 1991. While in the House, he supported President Ronald Reagan's push to expand vocational education. Craig was not a major force as a legislator during his time in the House.

Allegations of cocaine use and sex with male teenage congressional pages by unnamed congressmen were pursued by investigators and journalists in 1982. Craig issued a statement denying involvement. Craig stated "Persons who are unmarried as I am, by choice or by circumstance, have always been the subject of innuendos, gossip and false accusations. I think this is despicable." Craig served on the House Ethics Committee. In 1989 Craig was reported to have led an extended effort that pushed for more severe punishment of Representative Barney Frank for his involvement in a gay prostitution scandal.

U.S. Senate

Craig announced his candidacy for the 1990 Senate election for the seat vacated by the retiring James A. McClure. Craig defeated Idaho Attorney General Jim Jones in the Republican primary. In the general election he defeated Democratic former Idaho Legislature member Ron J. Twilegar with 61 percent of the vote.

In 1995, Craig formed a barbershop quartet called The Singing Senators with Senators Trent Lott, John Ashcroft, and James Jeffords.

Craig was reelected in 1996, with 57 percent of the vote, defeating Democrat Walt Minnick. He was reelected again in the 2002 election with 65 percent of the vote, when he spent $3.2 million to defeat Alan Blinken.

In 1999 Craig became sharply critical of U.S. President Bill Clinton for the Monica Lewinsky scandal. Speaking on NBC's Meet The Press, Craig told Tim Russert: "The American people already know that Bill Clinton is a bad boy – a naughty boy. I'm going to speak out for the citizens of my state, who in the majority think that Bill Clinton is probably even a nasty, bad, naughty boy."

Craig served as Senate Republican Policy Committee chairman from 1997 until 2003. He then became chairman of the Special Committee on Aging. After the Democrats gained control of the Senate in the 2006 Congressional election, Craig became the ranking member of the Committee on Veterans' Affairs and a member of the Appropriations Committee and the Energy and Natural Resources Committee. He served as the ranking member of the Interior and Related Agencies Appropriations Subcommittee. Amid the controversy surrounding his arrest, in August 2007 Craig temporarily stepped aside as ranking member on the Veterans' Affairs Committee and two subcommittees.

Craig is a longtime advocate for a balanced budget amendment to the United States Constitution.

In May 2003, Craig put a hold on more than 200 Air Force promotions in an attempt to pressure the Air Force to station four new C-130 cargo planes in Idaho, saying he received a commitment from the Air Force almost seven years earlier that the planes would be delivered. Defense Department officials said the reason the C-130s had not been sent to Idaho was that no new aircraft were being manufactured for the type of transport mission done by the Idaho Air National Guard unit where Craig wanted the planes delivered.

Craig supported the guest worker program proposed by President George W. Bush. In April 2005, Craig tried to amend an Iraq War supplemental bill with an amendment that would have granted legal status to between 500,000 and one million illegal immigrants in farm work. The amendment failed with 53 votes (60 votes were needed because the amendment was not relevant to the underlying bill). A version of the AgJOBS legislation was included in the Senate-passed immigration reform bill in 2006. Craig, the principal sponsor of AgJOBS, continues to support amnesty for illegal immigrants who are "trusted workers with a significant work history in American agriculture." This position has been sharply criticized by anti-illegal immigration activists. On June 26, 2007, Craig reiterated his support for the Comprehensive Immigration Reform Act of 2007.

In October 2005, Craig suggested that flooded sections of New Orleans should be abandoned after Hurricane Katrina had hit and was quoted on a Baton Rouge television station as saying that "Fraud is in the culture of Iraqis. I believe that is true in the state of Louisiana as well."

On December 16, 2005, Craig voted against a cloture motion filed relative to the USA PATRIOT Act; the motion ultimately earned only 52 votes, and so a Democratic filibuster against extension of the act (due to expire at the end of 2005) was allowed to continue. On December 21, 2005, Craig backed a six-month extension of the Act while further negotiations took place. On February 9, 2006, Craig announced an agreement among himself, the White House, and fellow Senators John E. Sununu, Arlen Specter, Lisa Murkowski, Chuck Hagel and Richard Durbin to reauthorize the Act.

In 2006, Craig posted to his Senate website all the earmarks he had inserted into federal spending bills since joining the Senate Appropriations Committee in 1998.

The American Conservative Union rated Craig's 2005 voting record at 96 out of 100 points, while the Americans for Democratic Action rated him at 15 points. Craig supported the Federal Marriage Amendment, which barred extension of rights to same-sex couples; he voted for cloture on the amendment in both 2004 and 2006, and was a cosponsor in 2008. However, in late 2006 he appeared to endorse the right of individual states to create same-sex civil unions, but said he would vote "yes" on an Idaho constitutional amendment banning same-sex marriages when pressured to clarify his position by the anti-gay rights advocacy group Families for a Better Idaho. Craig voted against cloture on a 2002 bill which would have extended the federal definition of hate crimes to cover sexual orientation. This legislation was passed in 2007 in both the House and the Senate as the Local Law Enforcement Hate Crimes Prevention Act of 2007. Craig voted against the measure. The LGBT advocacy group the Human Rights Campaign issued guides to candidates' voting records in 2004, giving Craig a 0 rating.

Prior to the nomination of Idaho Governor Dirk Kempthorne, Craig was mentioned as a possible candidate to succeed Gale Norton as United States Secretary of the Interior in March 2006.

In June 2012, the Federal Election Commission sued Craig for repayment of $217,000 of campaign funds which he used to pay for his defense in his criminal case. In an August 2012 filing, Craig's lawyer Andrew Herman wrote "Not only was the trip itself constitutionally required, but Senate rules sanction reimbursement for any cost relating to a senator's use of a bathroom while on official travel"; the filing cited an FEC ruling that allowed former Congressman Jim Kolbe to use campaign funds for his legal defense in the Mark Foley scandal. A federal court in Washington, D.C. found him liable for the full sum, and on March 4, 2016, the U.S. Court of Appeals affirmed that judgment.

Committee assignments
Committee on Appropriations
Subcommittee on Agriculture, Rural Development, Food and Drug Administration, and Related Agencies
Subcommittee on Energy and Water Development
Subcommittee on Homeland Security
Subcommittee on Interior, Environment, and Related Agencies
Subcommittee on Military Construction and Veterans' Affairs, and Related Agencies
Committee on Environment and Public Works
Subcommittee on Public Sector Solutions to Global Warming, Oversight, and Children's Health Protection
Subcommittee on Superfund and Environmental Health
Committee on Energy and Natural Resources
Subcommittee on Energy
Subcommittee on Public Lands and Forests
Subcommittee on Water and Power
Committee on Veterans' Affairs
Special Committee on Aging

Idaho Hall of Fame induction
In 2007, the Idaho Hall of Fame Association inducted Larry Craig into the Idaho Hall of Fame, one of many politicians inducted throughout the decade.

In 2014, Craig was the Idaho Republican Party financial chair.

2007 arrest and consequences

On June 11, 2007, Craig was arrested at the Minneapolis–Saint Paul International Airport for lewd conduct in a men's restroom, where he was accused of soliciting a male undercover police officer for sexual activity. During the resulting interview with the arresting officer, Craig insisted upon his innocence, disputing the officer's version of the event by stating that he merely had a "wide stance" (Craig states that he said he was a "wide guy") and that he had been picking up a piece of paper from the floor.

Craig was charged with interference with privacy, a gross misdemeanor offense, and a disorderly conduct misdemeanor. Despite his statements of innocence during the police interview, Craig pleaded guilty to the misdemeanor charge of disorderly conduct by signing and mailing a plea petition, dated August 1, 2007, to the Hennepin County District Court. Including fines and fees, he paid $575. Craig signed the petition to enter his guilty plea, which contained the provisions, "I understand that the court will not accept a plea of guilty from anyone who claims to be innocent... I now make no claim that I am innocent of the charge to which I am entering a plea of guilty." Craig mailed his signed petition to the court, and his petition to plead guilty to the misdemeanor charge was accepted and filed by the court on August 8, 2007. In an August 28, 2007 press conference, Craig regretted filing the guilty plea, stating "In hindsight, I should not have pled guilty. I was trying to handle this matter myself quickly and expeditiously".

At a news conference on September 1, 2007, Craig announced his intent to resign, "with sadness and deep regret", effective September 30, 2007. On September 4, 2007, a spokesperson for Craig indicated that he was reconsidering his decision to resign, if his conviction was rapidly overturned and his committee assignments were restored. The following week, Craig's attorneys filed a motion to withdraw his guilty plea, arguing that it "was not knowing and intelligent and therefore was in violation of his constitutional rights." The motion was ultimately denied, upholding the initial guilty plea. The controversy forced Craig to step down from his position as liaison to the Senate on the Romney campaign. Craig was vehemently adamant that he was not homosexual, stating "I am not gay. I never have been gay."

Following the ruling, Craig announced that despite his previous statements to the contrary, he would serve out his Senate term. He stated that he intended to "continue my effort to clear my name in the Senate Ethics Committee—something that is not possible if I am not serving in the Senate." Craig did not seek reelection in 2008 and left office on January 3, 2009.

Both the 2009 documentary Outrage and the magazine Newsweek (June 7, 2010 issue) listed Craig, among others, as a conservative politician with a record of anti-gay legislation who was caught in a gay sex scandal.

In a lawsuit by the Federal Election Commission, it was determined that he improperly paid his attorneys in this matter from his campaign funds, and Craig was ordered in 2014 to pay the Treasury $242,535. On March 4, 2016, the U.S. Court of Appeals affirmed that judgment.

Post-Senate
After his retirement, Craig opened the consulting firm New West Strategies with his former chief of staff Mike Ware, focusing on energy issues. The consulting firm was shut down in 2019.

Election history

1988 Idaho 1st District United States Congressional Election

1986 Idaho 1st District United States Congressional Election

1984 Idaho 1st District United States Congressional Election

1982 Idaho 1st District United States Congressional Election

1980 Idaho 1st District United States Congressional Election

See also
List of federal political sex scandals in the United States

References

Further reading

External links

 
 Article about the Larry Craig scandal on Time.com
 Idaho Statesman study of Craig
 The Smoking Gun — Minnesota v. Larry Edwin Craig, Case No. 07043231, Police interview (audio and transcript), police report, criminal complaint and plea agreement
 State of Minnesota v. Larry Edwin Craig, Case No. 070403231, U.S. District Court (4th Dist., Hennepin County, MN)
 

|-

|-

|-

|-

|-

|-

|-

1945 births
21st-century American politicians
Methodists from Idaho
George Washington University alumni
Idaho National Guard personnel
Idaho Republicans
Idaho politicians convicted of crimes
Republican Party Idaho state senators
Living people
Members of the United States Congress stripped of committee assignment
People from Council, Idaho
People from Eagle, Idaho
Ranchers from Idaho
Republican Party members of the United States House of Representatives from Idaho
Republican Party United States senators from Idaho
University of Idaho alumni
United States Army soldiers
Members of Congress who became lobbyists